Antônio de Queirós Teles (1 February 1789 – 11 October 1870) was a Brazilian politician.

A Baron of Jundiaí of a noble family, he was a delegate of the Provincial Assembly of Brazil.

External links
Antônio de Queirós Teles

Brazilian politicians
1789 births
1870 deaths